Joković is a Serbo-Croatian surname, borne by both ethnic Serbs and Croats. It is a patronymic, derived from Joko, itself a diminutive of masculine given name Jokan. It may refer to:

Maro Joković (born 1987), Croatian water polo player
Mirjana Joković (born 1967), Serbian actress
Nocko Joković (born 1973), Danish footballer
Vladimir Joković (born 1967), Montenegrin sports official
Ana Joković (born 1979), Serbian former basketball player

See also
Đoković or Djokovic
Jokić
Jokanović

Croatian surnames
Serbian surnames